Acugamasus nepotulus is a species of mite in the family Ologamasidae.

This species was formerly in the genus Gamasellus.

References

nepotulus
Articles created by Qbugbot
Animals described in 1908